Joseph Everidge Kelleam (1913-1975), born in Boswell, Oklahoma, was an American writer. His first story, "Rust", appeared in Astounding Science Fiction in 1939.

His novels include:
 Overlords From Space (1956) Ace Books, bound dos-à-dos with Ray Cummings' The Man Who Mastered Time
 The Little Men (1960) Avalon (Hardback)
 Hunters of Space (1960) Avalon (Hardback) (serialized as Hunters Out of Space in Amazing Stories)
 When the Red King Woke (1966) Avalon (Hardback)

External links

 
 
 

1913 births
1975 deaths
20th-century American novelists
American male novelists
20th-century American poets
American science fiction writers
People from Choctaw County, Oklahoma
Novelists from Oklahoma
American male short story writers
American male poets
20th-century American short story writers
20th-century American male writers